The 2017 Travelers Curling Club Championship was held from November 20 to 25 at the Cataraqui Golf and Country Club in Kingston, Ontario.

Men

Teams

Round-robin standings

Pool A

Pool B

Playoffs

Quarterfinals
Thursday, November 24, 1:30pm

Semifinals
Thursday, November 24, 6:30pm

Bronze-medal game
Saturday, November 25, 9:00am

Final
Saturday, November 25, 9:00am

Women

Teams

Round-robin standings

Pool A

Pool B

Tiebreakers

Tiebreaker 1
Thursday, November 24, 11:00pm

Tiebreaker 2
Thursday, November 24, 8:30am

Playoffs

Quarterfinals
Thursday, November 24, 1:30pm

Semifinals
Thursday, November 24, 6:30pm

Bronze-medal game
Saturday, November 25, 9:00am

Final
Saturday, November 25, 9:00am

References

External links

2017 in Canadian curling
Curling in Ontario
Travelers Curling Club Championship
Sport in Kingston, Ontario
Travelers Curling Club Championship
Canadian Curling Club Championships